High Fidelity is a 2000 American romantic comedy-drama film directed by Stephen Frears, starring John Cusack, Iben Hjejle, Jack Black, Todd Louiso, and Lisa Bonet. The film is based on the 1995 British novel of the same name by Nick Hornby, with the setting moved from London to Chicago and the protagonist's name changed. Hornby expressed surprise at how faithful the adaptation was, saying "at times, it appears to be a film in which John Cusack reads my book."

Following a breakup with his most recent girlfriend, Rob Gordon recounts his most painful breakups, seeking to find a reason for his failed romances. The film is styled around Rob talking to the camera and narrating his own story.

Cusack was nominated for a Golden Globe Award for Best Actor – Motion Picture Musical or Comedy.

Plot
Rob Gordon is a music-loving man with a poor understanding of women. After being dumped by his long-term girlfriend, Laura, he tries to understand how he failed in his relationships by seeking out his old partners.

By day, he works at his record store, Championship Vinyl, where customers drift through. He and his employees Dick and Barry, armed with an encyclopedic knowledge of all things musical, compile "Top 5" lists for every conceivable occasion, openly mock the tastes of their customers, and sell few records.

Two shoplifting, skateboarding teenagers, Vince and Justin, are an annoyance to them until Rob listens to a recording that they made as The Kinky Wizards. He offers them a record deal, the first under his own label, Top 5 Records. During his off-hours, he pines for Laura and tries to win her back.

Laura's father, who liked Rob, dies. Rob attends his funeral with Laura. Shortly after the reception, Rob realizes he has always had one foot out of the door and never committed to her—and in doing so, neglected his own future. They resume living together. He meets a music columnist and develops a crush, but wonders while making a mixtape for her if he would always be jumping from rock to rock.

Rob tells Laura that other women are just fantasies, Laura is reality, and he never tires of her. He proposes marriage; she thanks him for asking. She arranges for him to revisit his former love of dee-jaying. At the celebration of the newly released single by Vince and Justin, where Barry's band Sonic Death Monkey plays "Let's Get It On", Rob is surprised that Barry's band is not a disaster. He is also relieved to discover that Barry has decided against using one of his original names for the band, "Sonic Death Monkey," or "Kathleen Turner Overdrive," preferring instead to call his band "Barry Jive and the Uptown Five."

Rob makes a mixtape for Laura and feels he has finally learned how to make her happy.

Cast

 John Cusack as Rob Gordon
 Iben Hjejle as Laura
 Jack Black as Barry Judd
 Todd Louiso as Dick
 Catherine Zeta-Jones as Charlie Nicholson
 Lisa Bonet as Marie DeSalle
 Sara Gilbert as Anaugh Moss
 Lili Taylor as Sarah Kendrew
 Joan Cusack as Liz
 Tim Robbins as Ian "Ray" Raymond
 Joelle Carter as Penny Hardwick
 Chris Rehmann as Vince
 Ben Carr as Justin
 Natasha Gregson Wagner as Caroline Fortis
 Drake Bell as young Rob Gordon
 Bruce Springsteen as himself 
 Ian Williams as a guy in record store 
 Al Johnson as a record store geek

Production

Development
Nick Hornby's book was optioned by Disney's Touchstone Pictures in 1995, where it went into development for three years. Mike Newell was slated to direct the film with a script written by Con Air screenwriter Scott Rosenberg. Disney executive Joe Roth had a conversation with recording executive Kathy Nelson, who recommended John Cusack and his writing and producing partners D. V. DeVincentis and Steve Pink adapt the book. She had previously worked with them on Grosse Pointe Blank and felt that they had the right sensibilities for the material. According to Cusack, DeVincentis is the closest to the record-obsessive characters in the film, owning 1,000 vinyl records and thousands of CDs and tapes. They wrote a treatment that was immediately greenlit by Roth.

Screenplay
The writers decided to change the book's setting from London to Chicago because they were more familiar with the city, and it also had a "great alternative music scene", according to Pink. Cusack said, "When I read the book I knew where everything was in Chicago. I knew where the American Rob went to school and dropped out, where he used to spin records. I knew two or three different record shops when I was growing up that had a Rob, a Dick and a Barry in them". Charlotte Tudor, of the film's distributor, Buena Vista, said: "Chicago has the same feel as north London, there is a vibrant music scene, a lot of the action is set in smoky bars and, of course, there is the climate. But everyone, including Nick, felt that geography was not the central issue. It has a universal appeal". Scenes were filmed in the neighborhood of Wicker Park, and on the campus of Lane Tech High School.

Cusack found that the greatest challenge adapting the novel was pulling off Rob Gordon's frequent breaking of the fourth wall and talking directly to the audience. The screenwriters did this to convey Rob's inner confessional thoughts, and were influenced by a similar technique in the Michael Caine film, Alfie. Cusack rejected this approach because he thought that "there'd just be too much of me." Once director Stephen Frears signed on to direct, he suggested using the technique and everyone agreed.

Cusack and the writers floated the idea that Rob could have a conversation with Bruce Springsteen in his head, inspired by a reference in Hornby's book where the narrator wishes he could handle his past girlfriends as well as Springsteen does in his song "Bobby Jean" on Born in the U.S.A. They never believed they would actually get the musician to appear in the film, but thought putting him in the script would make the studio excited about it. Cusack knew Springsteen socially, and called the musician up and pitched the idea. Springsteen asked for a copy of the script and subsequently agreed to do it.

Near the film's completion, it was revealed that Scott Rosenberg would share screenplay credit with Cusack, DeVincentis & Pink. Rosenberg's original draft took place in Boston and was drastically different from Hornby's book and the writing team's adaptation. The three reached out to Rosenberg who agreed to take his name off the credits. However, Rosenberg eventually refused to do so, leading to a writing credit dispute. According to Pink, Rosenberg was given credit due to a now-abolished rule in the WGA which gave full credit to the first screenwriter attached to any adaptation for "anything they extracted from the book, or from the material from which they were adapting."

Casting
Frears was at the Berlin International Film Festival and seeing Mifune's Last Song, starring Iben Hjejle, realized that he had found the female lead. Frears read Hornby's book and enjoyed it, but did not connect with the material because it was not about his generation. He accepted the job because he wanted to work with Cusack again (after teaming on The Grifters) and liked the idea of changing the setting from London to Chicago. The director was also responsible for insisting on keeping Jack Black in the part of Barry. Black never auditioned and had initially passed on the part until Frears convinced him to take the role. Frears has said that many people from the studio came to watch his rushes. The role of Dick was originally offered to David Arquette, and Artie Lang auditioned for Barry. Todd Louiso was cast as Dick after Arquette passed on the offer. Liz Phair was also considered for the character Marie DeSalle, before Lisa Bonet was cast.

Filming
Production began on April 26, 1999 in Chicago, Illinois. Filming also took place on location at Wicker Park and the Biograph Theater, as well as authentic music venues.

Soundtrack

Track listing
 "You're Gonna Miss Me" – 13th Floor Elevators
 "Ev'rybody's Gonna Be Happy" – The Kinks
 "I'm Wrong About Everything" – John Wesley Harding
 "Oh! Sweet Nuthin'" – The Velvet Underground
 "Always See Your Face" – Love
 "Most of the Time" – Bob Dylan
 "Fallen for You" – Sheila Nicholls
 "Dry the Rain" – The Beta Band
 "Shipbuilding" – Elvis Costello & The Attractions
 "Cold Blooded Old Times" – Smog
 "Let's Get It On" – Barry Jive & The Uptown Five (Jack Black)
 "Lo Boob Oscillator" – Stereolab
 "The Inside Game" – Royal Trux
 "Who Loves the Sun" – The Velvet Underground
 "I Believe (When I Fall in Love It Will Be Forever)" – Stevie Wonder

Additional songs
 "Walking on Sunshine" - Katrina and the Waves
 "I Just Called to Say I Love You" - Stevie Wonder
 "The River" - Bruce Springsteen
 "Baby, I Love Your Way" - Marie de Salle (Lisa Bonet)
 "I'm Gonna Love You Just a Little More Baby" - Barry White
 "I Feel Like Naked" - Sexypop
 "Soaring and Boring" - Plush
 "My Little Red Book" - Love
 "Stolen Car" - Bruce Springsteen
 "Drive All Night" - Bruce Springsteen

One of the challenges that the screenwriters faced was figuring out which songs would be used where in the film because Rob, Dick, and Barry "are such musical snobs," according to Cusack. He and his screenwriting partners listened to 2,000 songs and picked 70 song cues.

Reception
High Fidelity premiered at the El Capitan Theater in Hollywood. The post-party was held at the Sunset Room, where Tenacious D performed. The film was opened in a wide release on March 31, 2000, grossing $6.4 million during its opening weekend. It grossed $47.1 million worldwide, of which $27.3 million was from the US.

Critical response
High Fidelity received positive reviews from critics and has a "Certified Fresh" score of 91% on Rotten Tomatoes, based on 164 reviews, with an average rating of 7.60/10. The critical consensus states: "The deft hand of director Stephen Frears and strong performances by the ensemble cast combine to tell an entertaining story with a rock-solid soundtrack." The film has a score of 79 out of 100 on Metacritic, based on 35 critics, indicating "generally favorable reviews." Audiences polled by CinemaScore gave the film an average grade of "C+" on an A+ to F scale.

Roger Ebert gave the film four out of four stars and wrote, "Watching High Fidelity, I had the feeling I could walk out of the theater and meet the same people on the street — and want to, which is an even higher compliment." In his review for the Washington Post, Desson Howe praised Jack Black as "a bundle of verbally ferocious energy. Frankly, whenever he's in the scene, he shoplifts this movie from Cusack." In his review for The New York Times, Stephen Holden praised Cusack's performance, writing, "a master at projecting easygoing camaraderie, he navigates the transitions with such an astonishing naturalness and fluency that you're almost unaware of them." USA Today did not give the film a positive review: "Let's be kind and just say High Fidelity doesn't quite belong beside Grosse Pointe Blank and The Sure Thing in Cusack's greatest hits collection. It's not that he isn't good. More like miscast." In his review for Entertainment Weekly, Owen Gleiberman gave the film a "B−" rating and wrote, "In High Fidelity, Rob's music fixation is a signpost of his arrested adolescence; he needs to get past records to find true love. If the movie had had a richer romantic spirit, he might have embraced both in one swooning gesture."

Peter Travers, in his review for Rolling Stone, wrote, "It hits all the laugh bases, from grins to guffaws. Cusack and his Chicago friends—D.V. DeVincentis and Steve Pink—have rewritten Scott Rosenberg's script to catch Hornby's spirit without losing the sick comic twists they gave 1997's Grosse Pointe Blank." In his review for The Observer, Philip French wrote, "High Fidelity is an extraordinarily funny film, full of verbal and visual wit. And it is assembled with immense skill." Stephanie Zacharek, in her review for Salon.com, praised Iben Hjejle's performance: "Hjejle's Laura is supremely likable: She's so matter-of-fact and grounded that it's perfectly clear why she'd become exasperated with a guy like Rob, who perpetually refuses to grow up, but you can also see how her patience and calm are exactly the things he needs."

Legacy
Empire magazine readers voted High Fidelity the 446th greatest film in their "500 Greatest Movies of All Time" poll. It is also ranked #14 on Rotten Tomatoes' 25 Best Romantic Comedies. In its June 2010 issue, Chicago magazine rated it #1 in a list of the top 40 movies ever filmed in Chicago.

Alternative singer-songwriter Regina Spektor was watching the movie when she wrote her 2006 song "Fidelity", which marked her first entry into the Billboard charts. That same year a musical stage adaptation premiered on Broadway and ran for 13 performances. In 2010, Tanya Morgan member Donwill released the solo album Don Cusack In High Fidelity, which he recorded from the perspective of the film's character.

Television series
 
In April 2018, ABC Signature Studios announced that it was developing a television series adaptation of High Fidelity with Midnight Radio (Scott Rosenberg, Jeff Pinkner, Josh Appelbaum, and Andre Nemec). Rosenberg would return to script the series, which features a female lead in the Cusack role. The series was adapted by Veronica West and Sarah Kucserka. In late September 2018, Zoë Kravitz, Lisa Bonet's daughter, was cast as the lead. The first season consists of ten episodes.

Originally announced for Disney's then-upcoming streaming service Disney+, it was reported in April 2019 that the series had been shifted to Hulu. Disney+'s SVP of content Agnes Chu stated that the series had "evolved" in a direction that was better-suited for Hulu.

On October 30, 2019, it was announced that the series would premiere on February 14, 2020. In August 2020, the series was canceled, after one season.

References

Further reading
 "The Cusacks" by Scott Tobias. The Onion A.V. Club. March 29, 2000.

External links

 
 
 
 
 
 High Fidelity: Tenth Anniversary of a Film About Music

2000s American films
2000s English-language films
2000 films
2000 romantic comedy-drama films
American rock music films
American romantic comedy-drama films
Films based on British novels
Films based on works by Nick Hornby
Films directed by Stephen Frears
Films produced by Tim Bevan
Films scored by Howard Shore
Films set in the 1980s
Films set in the 1990s
Films set in Chicago
Films shot in Chicago
Films with screenplays by Scott Rosenberg
Touchstone Pictures films
Working Title Films films